Chickering & Sons was an American piano manufacturer located in Boston, Massachusetts. The company was founded in 1823 by Jonas Chickering and James Stewart, but the partnership dissolved four years later. By 1830 Jonas Chickering became partners with John Mackay, manufacturing pianos as "Chickering & Company", and later "Chickering & Mackays" until the senior Mackay's death in 1841, and reorganized as "Chickering & Sons" in 1853. Chickering pianos continued to be made until 1983.

History

It was P.T. Barnum who persuaded Jenny Lind - the Swedish Nightingale - to make a concert tour of the United States. After her agreement, Barnum commissioned the Chickering company to manufacture a custom grand piano for her nationwide tour, ultimately involving 93 performances. The piano was completed by August 1850; Lind arrived in September and the concert series began in Boston. Her pianist was Otto Goldschmidt, whom she married at the end of her tour.

Coincidentally, as the tour began, Henry E. Steinway (Steinweg) and his large family arrived in New York as immigrants from Germany. Henry attended the opening night of the NYC concert series but showed little interest in the diva. His profound interest was in the Chickering piano, to which he dashed for such careful examination that he nearly had to be hauled away so the concert could begin.

On December 1, 1852, a fire destroyed Chickering's piano factory located at 336 Washington Street in Boston. One policeman was killed. The walls of the building collapsed, and set adjoining structures on fire. A new factory was built in 1853-54 at 791 Tremont Street in Boston.  From 1860-1868 space in the building was the location of the Spencer Repeating Rifle Company, who made over 100,000 rifles and carbines for the U.S. Army and sportsmen from 1862-1868. This structure still stands today. It was renovated into artist studios in 1972.

Jonas Chickering made several major contributions to the development of piano technology, most notably by introducing a one-piece, cast-iron plate to support the greater string tension of larger grand pianos.  He also invented a new deflection of the strings, and in 1845 the first convenient method for over stringing in square pianos. Instead of setting the strings side by side, the company introduced substituting an arrangement of the string in two banks, one over the other. This not only saved space but brought the powerful bass strings directly over the most resonant part of the sound-board, a principle used to this day in the construction of all pianos, both grands and uprights.

Chickering was the largest piano manufacturer in the United States in the middle of the 19th century, but was surpassed in the 1860s by Steinway.  In 1867, Jonas's son Frank Chickering had the Imperial Cross of the Legion of Honour, then one of the world's most prestigious non-military awards, bestowed upon him by Emperor Napoleon III for services to the art of music, one of more than 200 awards the piano manufacturer garnered over the years.

The company became in 1908 part of the American Piano Company (Ampico), and continued after the merger in 1932 of American with the Aeolian Company, to form Aeolian-American. That company went out of business in 1985, and the Chickering name continued to be applied to new pianos produced by Wurlitzer and then the Baldwin Piano Company.

Chickering Halls

The firm commissioned and operated several concert halls in Boston and New York:

 Chickering's building, Boston (c. 1850s), no.334 Washington St.
 Chickering's Hall, Boston (1860-1870), no.246 Washington St.
 Chickering Hall concert auditorium, 130 5th Avenue, New York City (1877), designed by George B. Post, and the venue for Oscar Wilde's first lecture in America in 1882 (razed) 
 Chickering Hall, Boston (1883-c. 1894), no.152 Tremont St., near West St.
 Chickering Hall, Boston (1901-c. 1912), Huntington Ave., corner of Massachusetts Ave.
 Chickering Hall, 27 West 57th Street, NYC (1923), designed by Cross & Cross (1924)

Images

References

Further reading
 Chickering & Sons. Catalog, 1883
 Chickering & Sons. Exhibit of musical instruments, Boston, 1902

External links 

Chickering in the grand piano-Photoarchive
 Boston Public Library. Chickering Piano Factory building. Boston, South End. Photo by J.J. Hawes, 19th century
 Flickr.
 Photo of Piano Factory, Tremont St., South End, Boston, 2011
 Photo of Piano Factory, Tremont St., South End, Boston, 2010

19th century in Boston
Manufacturing companies established in 1823
American companies established in 1823
Musical instrument manufacturing companies based in Boston
Piano manufacturing companies of the United States
Economic history of Boston